The women's triple jump at the 2007 All-Africa Games was held on July 18.

Results

References
Results

Triple
2007